Barria is a genus of fungi in the family Phaeosphaeriaceae. This is a monotypic genus, containing the single species Barria piceae. It was named after mycologist Margaret E. Barr.

References

Phaeosphaeriaceae
Monotypic Dothideomycetes genera